Crambicybalomia is a monotypic moth genus of the family Crambidae and subfamily Cybalomiinae. Its only species, Crambicybalomia ariditalis, is found in Namibia and South Africa. Both the genus and species were first described by Wolfram Mey in 2011

References

Cybalomiinae
Moths of Africa
Crambidae genera
Monotypic moth genera